Michel Arnaud (17 November 1915 – 1 August 1990) was a French Army general who distinguished himself in World War II, and for this was decorated with the Ordre de la Libération and made Grand Officier de la Légion d'honneur.

Biography
Son of a pharmacist, Arnaud was born on November 17, 1915 in Bourg-en-Bresse. After studying in Dijon in the Lyceum Carnot, he opted for the military career and went in 1935 to the École Spéciale Militaire de Saint-Cyr, the foremost French military academy.

Arnaud had chosen to enter in the colonial infantry, and when Charles de Gaulle issued the Appeal of June 18 in 1940 for resistance against the Axis, he was a lieutenant stationed at Faya-Largeau in Chad and attached to the Régiment de Tirailleurs Sénégalais du Tchad (RTST), and on 26 August sided with de Gaulle, like all soldiers of the RTST.

He participated to Philippe Leclerc's offensive against Italian positions in Libya, but was badly wounded near Kufra on 8 February 1941, and sent to hospital first at Yaoundé and then at Beirut. In January 1942 he entered in the staff of General Georges Catroux, head of the Free French Forces in the Middle East, and was promoted Captain in June.

In 1943 he was again put under the orders of Leclerc, and under his command was to remain till the end of the war. For his old wound till 1 December 1944; having after asked to return to field duty, he was assigned to the Régiment du March de Tchad (RMT), the new name of the RTST.

After 1945, Arnaud took part to the First Indochina War, and in the 1960s was promoted first Colonel and then Brigade General. In 1969 Arnaud returned to Chad as commander of Opération Bison, a military operation that had to contain the menace represented to the Chadian government by the FROLINAT rebels; but tensions with the Chadian President brought to his replacement just a few months after his arrival.

After that, Arnaud held several other positions, until he was made Corps General in 1974. He died on 1 August 1990 at Frejus, and is buried at Grenoble.

Decorations
Grand Officer of the Légion d'honneur
Companion of the Liberation (7 July 1945)
Croix de guerre 1939-1945 (3 citations)
Croix de guerre des Théatres d'Opérations Exterieures (2 citations)
Croix de la Valeur Militaire
Médaille coloniale with "Koufra" clasp
Insigne des blessés militaires
Officer of the Order of the Black Star (Benin)

External links
 Biography

1915 births
1990 deaths
Military personnel from Bourg-en-Bresse
Companions of the Liberation
Grand Officiers of the Légion d'honneur
Recipients of the Croix de Guerre 1939–1945 (France)
Recipients of the Croix de guerre des théâtres d'opérations extérieures
Recipients of the Cross for Military Valour
French military personnel of World War II
French military personnel of the First Indochina War
École Spéciale Militaire de Saint-Cyr alumni